Surfabout was a surfing competition held annually in Sydney, Australia between 1974 and 1991. It was sponsored by Coca-Cola and radio station 2SM and hence called the Coke Surfabout or the Coke/2SM Surfabout. The contest was run in late Autumn, after the Bells Beach Classic at Easter.

The contest was taken to Channel 9 in 1978 by 2SM Program Director Barry Chapman who convinced then Director of Sport David Hill that Surfabout would make great television. The promotions and advertising manager at the time for Coca-Cola bottlers Sydney was Colin Gelling who was instrumental in televising the event and was executive producer. The series won a Gold Logie for 'Best Sports Event' that year.  Surfabout had a waiting period and was mobile so it could go to the best waves on Sydney's northern beaches. It also followed the man on man format, previously devised by Peter Drouyn for the 1977 Stubbies at Burleigh Heads, Queensland, and this added further excitement for spectators and television viewers

In 1979 down to the round of 16, Sydney went completely flat and showed no signs of improving. With the contest and television program series at risk, Surfabout showed just how mobile a "mobile" contest can be when Chapman and Hill after discussion with Contest Director Holmes (Tracks magazine Editor) took the decision a great cost to the sponsors to fly the final 16 contestants, contest officials and television crew 600 miles to big cold waves at Bells Beach for the remaining rounds. Six light aircraft flew over Bells Beach to find a beautiful 8 ft swell lined up off Point Rincon. Cheyne Horan was the winner of this never to be repeated spectacular.

In 1991 Coke ran a promotion giving the winner of a "pick the best wave" television competition a spot competing in the Surfabout. This was controversial among professional surfers because it would put some couch potato into a contest which had, at the time, the second-highest prize money on the world tour. Mark Richards defended them, saying "without Coke there is no such thing as professional surfing in Australia". The idea might have been a stunt, but with an endorsement like that from one of the big names in Australian surfing the controversy evaporated.

Winners 
(This list is incomplete.)
{|border="1" cellpadding="2"
|Year||Winner
|-
|1974||Michael Peterson
|-
|1975||Wayne Lynch
|-
|1976||Mark Richards
|-
|1977||Simon Anderson
|-
|1978||Larry Blair
|-
|1979||Cheyne Horan
|-
|1980||Buzzy Kerbox
|-
|1981||Simon Anderson
|-
|1982||Wayne Bartholomew
|-
|1983||Tom Carroll
|}

References
 Mark Richards: A Surfing Legend, authorised biography by David Knox, 1992, .

Surfing competitions
Surfing in Australia